The Primorsky Regional Committee of the Communist Party of the Soviet Union, commonly referred to as the Primorsky CPSU kraikom, was the position of highest authority in the Primorsky Krai, in the Russian SFSR of the Soviet Union. The position was created in 1922, and abolished on August 23, 1991. The First Secretary was a de facto appointed position usually by the Politburo or the General Secretary himself.

List of First Secretaries of the Communist Party of Primorye

See also
Primorsky Krai

Notes

Sources
 World Statesmen.org

Regional Committees of the Communist Party of the Soviet Union
Politics of Primorsky Krai
1922 establishments in the Soviet Union
1991 disestablishments in the Soviet Union